Grandes Canciones is the third album by Argentine singer Noel Schajris released on June 7, 2011.  It is an album made up of covers of songs made popular by other Spanish-language singers, with one English-language exception; Tears In Heaven, originally recorded by Eric Clapton.

Track listing
 Quien Como Tú (originally recorded by Ana Gabriel)
 La Incondicional (originally recorded by Luis Miguel)
 Bachata Rosa (originally recorded by Juan Luis Guerra y 4.40)
 Quiero Dormir Cansado (originally recorded by Emmanuel)
 A Medio Vivir (originally recorded by Ricky Martin)
 Tu Carcel (originally recorded by Los Bukis)
 Te Amo (originally recorded by Franco De Vita)
 Lamento Boliviano (originally recorded by Enanitos Verdes)
 Si Tú Supieras (originally recorded by Alejandro Fernandez)
 Mi Historia Entre Tus Dedos (originally recorded by Gianluca Grignani)
 Tears In Heaven (originally recorded by Eric Clapton)
 Me Va an Extrañar (originally recorded by Ricardo Montaner)

Certifications

References

2009 albums
Noel Schajris albums
Covers albums